Ayaaz Ahmed (born 20 July 1996), is a Maldivian footballer currently playing as a forward for Da Grande Sports Club.
Ayaaz Ahmed is regarded as one of the best futsal players in Maldives

Club career
On 28 January 2018, he joined Kuda Henveiru United for the Second Division.

International career
Ayaaz's first international match was a 2–1 defeat against Syria on 10 October 2019 at Rashid Stadium, Dubai, replacing Hussain Nihan in the 82nd minute.

Career statistics

International

References

External links
 
 

1996 births
Living people
Maldivian footballers
Maldives international footballers
Association football forwards
Da Grande Sports Club players